François-Joseph Leduc (November 21, 1895 – February 8, 1985) was a Canadian politician.  He was a Member of the provincial legislature and a City Councillor in Montreal, Quebec.

Background

He was born in Montreal on November 21, 1895.

City Councillor

Leduc was elected to the City Council in the district of Ahuntsic in 1934, but did not run for re-election in 1936.

Member of the legislature

He successfully ran as a Conservative candidate in the provincial district of Laval in the 1935 election and was re-elected as a Union Nationale candidate in the 1936 election.

He served as Minister of Transportation from 1936 to 1938, but was dismissed by Prime Minister Maurice Duplessis.

Leduc crossed the floor and joined the Liberals. He was re-elected in the 1939 and 1944 elections, but was defeated in the 1948 election.

Death

He died on February 8, 1985.

References

1895 births
1985 deaths
Conservative Party of Quebec MNAs
Quebec Liberal Party MNAs
Montreal city councillors
People from Mirabel, Quebec
Union Nationale (Quebec) MNAs